"A Day in the Life of Donald Duck" is a 1956 episode of the Disneyland TV show. As the name of the episode implies, viewers experience Donald Duck himself as he struggles through a typical day at the Walt Disney Studios. In the process, he meets up with Jimmie Dodd, Roy Williams, the Mouseketeers and even his own voice, Clarence Nash. This episode introduces a song about Donald, "Quack, Quack, Quack, Donald Duck."

Home media
The film was released on December 6, 2005, on Walt Disney Treasures: The Chronological Donald, Volume Two: 1942-1946.

References

External links
 
 TV.com

1956 American television episodes
Walt Disney anthology television series episodes
Donald Duck